Carmen Molina (20 January 1920 – 17 October 1998) was a Mexican actress, singer, and dancer. She was considered a popular star of the Golden Age of Mexican cinema. Throughout her acting career, she was nominated for an Ariel Award for her supporting role in Las mañanitas (1948).

Filmography

Film

References
 Emilio García Riera, México visto por el cine extranjero, Volume 3, Ediciones Era, 1988, 
 José Rogelio Álvarez, Enciclopedia de México, Volume 9, Edition 4, 1978

External links

Actresses from Mexico City
1920 births
1998 deaths
Date of death missing
Golden Age of Mexican cinema
20th-century Mexican actresses
Mexican people of Spanish descent